Hure Banner (Mongolian:   Küriy-e qosiɣu) is a banner of southeastern Inner Mongolia, People's Republic of China, bordering Liaoning province to the south. It is under the administration of Tongliao City,  to the north-northeast.

Climate

References

External links
www.xzqh.org 

Banners of Inner Mongolia
Tongliao